Masri Feki is a French writer, researcher in the Paris 8 University, and a specialist of the geopolitics and the Middle East who lives in Paris. He is Middle East Pact's founding president and author of numerous articles published in newspapers of the Middle East and North Africa, including Al-Seyassah (Kuwait), Hürriyet (Turkey), Turkish Daily News (Turkey), The Jerusalem Post (Israel), Al-Ahram (Egypt) and El Watan (Algeria).

Views
Masri Feki, a vocal supporter of the Arab-Israeli peace process, called for integrating Israel into the Middle East. He rejected the idea that the Jewish State is an intruder in the region, and stated that Israel is the ancestral land of the Jews. He called for normalization of relations between Israel and its neighbors.

Main publications
 Syrie : La régionalisation et les enjeux internationaux d'une guerre imposée (Collective), L'Harmattan, Paris, 2013 (Syria: Regionalisation and International Stakes of an Imposed War).
 Les révoltes arabes, géopolitique et enjeux, Studyrama, Paris, 2011 (The Arab Uprisings: Geopolitics and Stakes).
 L'Iran paradoxal, dogmes et enjeux régionaux (Collective), L'Harmattan, Paris, 2008 (Paradoxical Iran, Regional Dogmas and Stakes).
 Géopolitique du Liban, Studyrama, Paris, 2008 (Geopolitics of Lebanon).
 Géopolitique du Moyen-Orient, Studyrama, Paris, 2008 (Geopolitics of the Middle East).
 Israël, géopolitique et enjeux, Studyrama, Paris, 2008 (Israel, Geopolitics and Stakes).
 L'axe irano-syrien, géopolitique et enjeux, Studyrama, Paris, 2007 (Iranian-Syrian Axis: Geopolitics and Stakes).

External links
 Masri Feki’s website
 Middle East Pact (MEP)

References

Living people
Academic staff of Paris 8 University Vincennes-Saint-Denis
Date of birth missing (living people)
Year of birth missing (living people)